Ella (minor planet designation: 435 Ella) is a typical Main belt asteroid. It was discovered by Max Wolf and A. Schwassmann on 11 September 1898 in Heidelberg. This is the eponymous member of a proposed asteroid family with at least 15 members.

Photometric observations during 1995 show a rotation period of 4.264 hours. 435 Ella is classified as a DCX-type asteroid.

References

External links
 
 

Background asteroids
Ella
Ella
Ella
DCX-type asteroids (Tholen)
18980911